NAFCA may refer to:
Nollywood and African Film Critics Awards
North American Family Campers Association